Eliot Paulina Sumner (born 30 July 1990) is an English singer, songwriter and actor.

Career

I Blame Coco
Sumner began writing songs at the age of 15, and signed a multi-record deal with Island Records at age 17. They spent six months writing and recording a debut album, The Constant (2010), in Sweden with producer Klas Åhlund, keyboardist Emlyn Maillard, and multi-instrumentalist and producer Al Shux under the band name I Blame Coco. The album included elements of pop music, electronic music, ska, and punk. The first single, "Caesar", featured Swedish pop singer Robyn. The next single, "Self Machine", was released in July 2010.

According to Christian Wåhlberg, Sumner's manager, Åhlund, had been keen to work with Sumner because she saw the "punk rocker" in them. Wåhlberg said that the electropop sound of the album was influenced by Darcus Beese, president of Island Records, and that if Sumner had signed to a different record label, the music would have been different.

Solo career 

In 2014, Sumner said their music would be released under their birth name, Eliot Sumner. Later that year, they released the EP Information, and in 2016 the full album Information appeared. Sumner's contributions to other musicians' albums include vocals for the song "End of the Road" by Sway and the single "Splash" by Sub Focus. They sang a cover version of the Radiohead song "Creep" with Clint Mansell for the soundtrack to the movie Filth (2013).

Acting career

Sumner appeared briefly in the films Me Without You (2001) and Stardust (2007). They made their adult acting debut in Guy Ritchie's The Gentlemen in 2020. They appeared in the James Bond film No Time to Die (2020). In December 2021, Sumner was cast in Showtime's drama series Ripley in a recurring role. They played a hiker in the thriller, Infinite Storm, appearing before Naomi Watts' character begins hiking to the summit of Mt. Washington.

Personal life
Eliot Paulina Sumner is the child of musician Sting (Gordon Sumner) and actress Trudie Styler. Sumner was born in Pisa, Italy, grew up in Wiltshire, England, and was educated at Bryanston School and then the Fine Arts College in London.

They grew up at Lake House, the family estate near Stonehenge. Eliot has two brothers (Jake and Giacomo), a sister (Mickey), an older half-brother (Joe), and a half-sister (Kate). Their family gave Sumner the nickname "Coco". Drawn to the outdoors, Sumner spent a lot of time alone in the woods. Their family gave Eliot their first guitar at age four or five. They wrote their first song at age 13 and signed a record deal four years later. After recording and touring with I Blame Coco, they lived alone in a cottage in the Lake District of England and became interested in house music. Sumner also works as a DJ in European dance clubs under the moniker "Vaal".

Sumner's sense of smell was lost after a brain injury in 2009. In December 2015, Sumner said that they did not believe in gender labels and did not identify with a particular gender. They use gender-neutral pronouns.

Awards and honours
 I Blame Coco was nominated for Best Newcomer at the Virgin Media Music Awards in 2010.

Discography

Studio albums

Singles

As lead artist

As featured artist

Other: Remixes 
 Eliot Sumner – After Dark (Mr Tophat's Alterned 303 Remix)
 Eliot Sumner – After Dark (Dixon Remix)
 Eliot Sumner – Firewood – Lakker Remix

Music videos

References

External links

 
 
 

1990 births
Living people
People from Pisa
People educated at Bryanston School
People educated at Fine Arts College
British indie rock musicians
English electronic musicians
English rock singers
English pop singers
English film actors
British LGBT musicians
Island Records artists
Sting (musician)
21st-century English musicians
Eliot
British LGBT singers
Non-binary musicians
British non-binary actors
English LGBT actors
Genderfluid people